Moshchenoye is a rural locality (a selo) and the administrative center of Moshchenskoye Rural Settlement, Yakovlevsky District, Belgorod Oblast, Russia. The population was 546 in 2010. There are ten streets.

Geography 
Moshchenoye is located 36 km southwest of Stroitel (the district's administrative centre) by road. Novaya Glinka is the nearest rural locality.

References 

Rural localities in Yakovlevsky District, Belgorod Oblast
Grayvoronsky Uyezd